Mir Deh (also Romanized as Mīr Deh, Mīredeh, Mīradeh; also known as Mīreh Deh) is a village in Mir Deh Rural District, in the Central District of Saqqez County, Kurdistan Province, Iran. At the 2006 census, its population was 805, in 140 families. The village is populated by Kurds.

References 

Towns and villages in Saqqez County
Kurdish settlements in Kurdistan Province